Robina Town Centre bus station is a bus stop servicing Robina Town Centre and Robina Community Centre in the suburb of Robina, Gold Coast Located on Robina Town Centre Drive the bus stop has six bus routes connecting the suburb with the northern, southern and eastern suburbs of the Gold Coast.

Translink bus stop information is available from TransLink.

See also

Transport on the Gold Coast, Queensland

References

Bus stations in Gold Coast City
Robina, Queensland